Lisa Marie Belcastro (born September 24, 1988) is an American politician who represented the 11th legislative district in the Maryland House of Delegates from 2020 to 2023. She was appointed to office in March 2020 by Governor Larry Hogan on the recommendation of the Baltimore County Democratic Central Committee. Belcastro took the seat vacated by Shelly L. Hettleman when Hettleman was appointed to the Senate seat vacated by Bobby Zirkin, who resigned in January.

Early life and career 
Belcastro was born in Chicago, Illinois on September 24, 1988. She attended Slippery Rock University in Slippery Rock, Pennsylvania, where she earned a B.S. degree in science health and physical education in 2012. Since graduating, she has worked as an adapted physical education teacher for Prince George's County Public Schools and as an assistant field hockey coach for Goucher College from 2012 to 2017.

Belcastro became involved with politics in 2017 by working as a volunteer coordinator for the Baltimore County Council campaign of Izzy Patoka. From 2019 to 2020, she worked as a legislative aide to Patoka.

In 2020, after Delegate Shelly L. Hettleman was elevated to the Maryland Senate following the resignation of former Senator Robert Zirkin, Belcastro applied to fill the vacancy left by Hettleman in the Maryland House of Delegates. The Baltimore County Democratic Central Committee voted 4-1 to nominate her to fill the vacancy over four other applicants, including former Delegate Ted Levin. Governor Hogan appointed Belcastro to the Maryland House of Delegates on March 10, 2020, and she was sworn in the same day.

In the legislature
Belcastro was sworn into the Maryland House of Delegates on March 10, 2020.

Committee assignments
 Member, Health and Government Operations Committee, 2020–present (government operations & health facilities subcommittee, 2020–2021; public health & minority health disparities subcommittee, 2020–present; health occupations & long-term care subcommittee, 2022–present)
 Study Group on Economic Stability, 2020–present

Other memberships
 Member, Maryland Legislative Latino Caucus, 2020–present
 Women Legislators of Maryland, 2020–present

Personal life
Belcastro is openly lesbian and is married to a woman. She lives in the Sudbrook Park neighborhood of Pikesville, Maryland.

Political positions

Assisted living
Belcastro introduced legislation in the 2021 legislative session that would require updates to Maryland's assisted living facility regulations, with specific protections for memory care units at these facilities. The bill unanimously passed both chambers of the Maryland General Assembly and became law on May 30, 2021.

Belcastro introduced legislation in the 2022 legislative session that requires the Maryland Health Commission to assess standards of care at Maryland's assisted living facilities with 10 or fewer beds.

Education
In July 2020, Belcastro signed onto a letter calling on the Baltimore County Public Schools system to alter the Student Code of Conduct to explicitly ban wearing or displaying symbols, such as the swastikas and the Confederate flag, unless it is necessary for educational programming.

Belcastro introduced legislation in the 2022 legislative session that would ban the practice of seclusion in public schools. The bill unanimously passed the House of Delegates on March 15, 2022, and is currently on second reading in the Maryland Senate.

Guns
In April 2020, Belcastro signed onto a letter calling on Governor Larry Hogan to close the state's gun stores during the COVID-19 pandemic.

References

External links 
 

1988 births
21st-century American politicians
21st-century American women politicians
Goucher College faculty and staff
Lesbian politicians
Living people
Democratic Party members of the Maryland House of Delegates
Politicians from Chicago
Slippery Rock University of Pennsylvania alumni
Women state legislators in Maryland
American women academics
LGBT state legislators in Maryland
LGBT people from Illinois